S. Sundarambal is an Indian politician and former Member of the Legislative Assembly of Tamil Nadu. She was elected to the Tamil Nadu legislative assembly from Mettur constituency as an Anna Dravida Munnetra Kazhagam candidate in 1991, and 2001 elections.

References 

Living people
21st-century Indian women politicians
21st-century Indian politicians
Year of birth missing (living people)
Tamil Nadu MLAs 1991–1996
Tamil Nadu MLAs 2001–2006
20th-century Indian women
20th-century Indian people
All India Anna Dravida Munnetra Kazhagam politicians
Women members of the Tamil Nadu Legislative Assembly